The Freedom Rider is an album by jazz drummer Art Blakey and his group the Jazz Messengers, recorded in 1961 and released in 1964 by Blue Note Records. Continuing Blakey's distinct brand of hard bop, this album features compositions from Wayne Shorter, Lee Morgan, Blakey himself, and Kenny Dorham, a former Jazz Messenger.  This was the final album by this particular edition of the Jazz Messengers, who had been together for 18 months, as Lee Morgan left after this album and was replaced by Freddie Hubbard.

Track listing

"Tell It Like It Is" (Shorter) – 7:53
"The Freedom Rider" (Blakey) – 7:25
"El Toro" (Shorter) – 6:20
"Petty Larceny" (Morgan) – 6:14
"Blue Lace" (Morgan) – 5:59

Bonus tracks on CD reissue:
"Uptight" (Morgan) – 6:12
"Pisces" (Morgan) – 6:52
"Blue Ching" (Kenny Dorham) – 6:43

Personnel

Art Blakey — drums
Lee Morgan — trumpet
Wayne Shorter — tenor saxophone
Bobby Timmons — piano
Jymie Merritt — double bass

References 

1964 albums
Art Blakey albums
The Jazz Messengers albums
Albums produced by Alfred Lion
Blue Note Records albums
Albums recorded at Van Gelder Studio